Leading chess players from the Mediterranean Chess Association member nations, and invited guest participants, are allowed to play in the Mediterranean Chess Championship. The Mediterranean Chess Association was established at the 73rd FIDE Congress in Bled, Slovenia and registered with FIDE as an affiliated international chess organization.

There was no Mediterranean Chess Championship event held for 2010, 2011 and 2013.

Mediterranean Chess Champions 
{| class="sortable wikitable"
! # !! Year !! City !! Men's Champion !! Women's Champion
|-
| 1 || 2003  ||      Beirut  ||     || 
|-
| 2 || 2004  ||      Antalya ||    || 
|-
| 3 || 2005* ||	Kemer   ||	    || 
|-
| 4 || 2006* ||	Cannes  ||	    || 
|-
| 5 || 2007  ||	Sousse  ||	    || 
|-
| 6 || 2008* ||      Antalya ||      || 
|-
| 7 || 2009  ||	Rijeka   ||	      || 
|-
| 8 || 2012*  || Beirut   ||      || 
|-
| 9 || 2014 || Chania ||  || 
|-
| 10 || 2015 || Beirut ||  || 
|}
*Note: Organized in the beginning of the following year.

References

Supranational chess championships
Recurring events established in 2003
2003 in chess
Sport in the Mediterranean